Big Sandy Airport  is a public use airport in Chouteau County, Montana, United States. It is owned by the Town of Big Sandy and located one nautical mile (2 km) south of its central business district. This airport is included in the National Plan of Integrated Airport Systems for 2011–2015, which categorized it as a general aviation facility.

Facilities and aircraft 
Big Sandy Airport covers an area of 154 acres (62 ha) at an elevation of 2,701 feet (823 m) above mean sea level. It has one asphalt paved runways designated 6/24 which measures 3,600 by 60 feet (1,097 x 18 m). It also has two turf runways: 13/31 is 2,975 by 50 feet (907 x 15 m) and 18/36 is 1,430 by 55 feet (436 x 17 m).

For the 12-month period ending July 21, 2011, the airport had 5,350 general aviation aircraft operations, an average of 103 per week: 93% local and 7% transient. At that time there were 17 single-engine aircraft based at this airport.

See also 
 List of airports in Montana

References

External links 
 Aerial image as of September 1997 from USGS The National Map

Airports in Montana
Transportation in Chouteau County, Montana
Buildings and structures in Chouteau County, Montana